Jon "Sackmaster" Kowalyshen (born April 14, 1985) is a professional American football player who played 6 seasons with the United Indoor Football (UIF), Continental Indoor Football League (CIFL) and the Indoor Football League (IFL).

Career

College
Kowalyshen started his collegiate career playing at William Rainey Harper College under head coach John Eliasik. At Western Illinois University, Jon played under coach Don Patterson and Ronnie Harmon.

College statistics

Pro
Kowalyshen's Professional Indoor Football career spanned the course of 6 seasons with 4 teams and in 3 different leagues.

 Sioux City Bandits (2006)
In Sioux City, Kowalyshen played under head coach Jose Jefferson with the Bandits of the United Indoor Football League for his rookie season. The team finished with a 6-9 record and clinched a playoff berth against the Rock River Raptors. In 16 games with the club, he led the team with 6.5 sacks for -39 yards.  He also posted 9.5 tackles for loss, blocked 6 kicks and was 4th on the team in tackles with 52.5. Other statistics of note include 8 quarterback hits, 2 fumble recoveries, a forced fumble and a pass break-up.

 Chicago Slaughter (2007)

Kowalyshen joined the Chicago Slaughter of the Continental Indoor Football League (CIFL) in 2007, playing under head coach Steve "Mongo" McMichael. Kowalyshen led the team with 13 sacks in 12 regular season games, had 47.5 tackles and posted 3 blocked kicks in a single game (10 blocked kicks all season). In two playoff games with the 2007 Slaughter, Kowalyshen scored a defensive touchdown, a safety, blocked 2 kicks, had 7 tackles for loss, forced a fumble and added another sack.

 Rock River Raptors (2009)
Remaining with the CIFL, Kowalyshen was traded to the Rock River Raptors in 2009, playing under head coach Dave Jones.  The highlight of Kowalyshen's year with the Raptors came when he tied the all-time CIFL single-game sack record with 4. His year-end sack total in 2009 was 12, an average of 1 per game. His statistics for 2009 included 62 tackles, 13 tackles for loss, 6 blocked kicks, 3 forced fumbles, a safety and 1 fumble recovery.

 Chicago Slaughter (2010-2012)
Kowalyshen proved to be a staple on defense for the Slaughter (now with the IFL) during the 2010, 2011 and 2012 seasons, contributing to 2 more berths in the playoffs. In 42 games for the Slaughter, Kowalyshen would post 131 tackles, 18 sacks, 16 blocked kicks, 19 tackles for loss, 6 forced fumbles, 1 fumble recovery, 5 pass break-ups, a safety and a defensive touchdown. The Slaughter had a combined record of 31-25 (2-3 playoffs) in his 4 years total with the team.

 Bloomington Extreme
Initially for the 2012 season Kowalyshen had signed with Bloomington Extreme and started 3 games. Kowalyshen was notified of his release by the Extreme but was picked up immediately by the Slaughter once again.

Awards and honors 
1997 IHSA All-State Special Mention (Defense)
1998 IHSA All-State First Team (Defense)
1998 The West Suburban Gold Conference Defensive Player of the Year
2000 Appearance in the NJCAA Dixie Rotary Bowl vs Dixie State Rebels
2001 Appearance in the Canon Empire State Bowl ranked 16th nationally vs the 13th ranked Nassau Community College Lions
2002 Gateway All-Newcomer Award Recipient
2002-2003 Gateway All-Conference Award Recipient
2007 CIFL First-Team Defense  
2007 CIFL Special Teams Player of the Week Honors (3 Blocked kicks in one game)
2009 CIFL Special Teams Player of the Week (4 sacks in one game)

Career highlights
ESPN's top 10 plays of the week in 2003 nationally televised Kowalyshen's sack technique of the Colgate University quarterback on a 4th down denial. Kowalyshen is also featured as a member of the Western Illinois University team on EA Sports' NCAA Football 2003 video game.

Kowalyshen's high school career sack record of 39, an IHSA all-time record, for West Leyden High School, has stood unbroken since 1999.

References

External links

American football defensive linemen
Sioux City Bandits players
Chicago Slaughter players
Rock River Raptors players
Bloomington Extreme players
Harper Hawks football players
Western Illinois Leathernecks football players
Players of American football from Chicago